The Sebring '75 Twelve Hours of Endurance, was the second round of the 1975 IMSA GT Championship and was held at the Sebring International Raceway, on March 21, 1975. Victory overall went to the No. 25 BMW Motorsport BMW 3.0 CSL driven by Brian Redman, Allan Moffat, Sam Posey, and Hans-Joachim Stuck.

Race results
Class winners in bold.

Class Winners

References

IMSA GTP
12 Hours of Sebring
12 Hours of Sebring
Sebring
12 Hours of Sebring